A pestiño is a Christmas or Holy Week pastry that is popular in Andalusia and other regions of southern Spain. It is a piece of dough, deep-fried in olive oil and glazed with honey or cinnamon sugar.

History 
The prestiño dates back to the 16th century, being mentioned in the book La Lozana Andaluza, which was written in 1528.

Characteristics
Normally the dough is flavoured with sesame. Its form and composition vary from region to region and are different in Medina-Sidonia, Cádiz, Chiclana de la Frontera, Sanlúcar de Barrameda, Rota, Salobreña and other towns in Andalusia. In these towns they are typical for Christmas but in the rest of Andalusia they are eaten throughout the year.

In Málaga they are called borrachuelos.

See also
Angel wings
 List of doughnut varieties
 List of fried dough varieties

References

External links

Spanish desserts
Andalusian cuisine
Christmas food
Spanish pastries
Doughnuts
Fried dough